The Tupolev ANT-17 (aka TSh-B, TSh-1) was a late 1920s design by the Tupolev Design Bureau for a ground-attack aircraft.

Design and development
In the late 1920s, armies underwent a worldwide trend towards mechanization in the form of tanks and light armored vehicles. This development demanded a new type of combat aircraft able to take on armored vehicles utilized by ground forces.

In 1929, the Tupolev OKB undertook design of an unconventional aircraft with maximum offensive armament and armor protection. Unfortunately, the weight of the armor meant that Tupolev doubted the ability of the ANT-17 to deliver the required performance, so the ANT-17 project was cancelled.

References

Anti-tank aircraft
ANT-17
1930s Soviet attack aircraft
Biplanes
Twin piston-engined tractor aircraft